John Shaw, MA FRSA (b. 1952) is a British stone letter-carver, based in Saxby, Lincolnshire, England.

Education

Shaw was educated at Derby College of Arts from 1970–71 where he was the Earp Legacy Award winner. He graduated from Camberwell School of Art and Crafts, in 1974 with a BA in Fine Art. A PGCE followed from Brighton Polytechnic in 1975, and then an MA in 1983 from Birmingham Polytechnic. Shaw has had Workshop experience with Seán Crampton, David Kindersley and Ieuân Rees. He is also a member of the Art Workers Guild.

Exhibitions
Shaw has had solo exhibitions in the Royal Society of Arts, Derby Museum and Art Gallery, Sam Scorer Gallery (Lincoln), Monnow Valley Arts Centre (Herefordshire), Harley Gallery and Foundation at Welbeck Abbey.

List of works

Sir Frank Whittle in Westminster Abbey
Accrington Pals for St John’s Church Accrington
Bishop John Robinson in Arncliffe, North Yorkshire
Valley Parade Fire in Bradford Cathedral
Fund Raisers in Bradford Cathedral
Royal Maundy in Bradford Cathedral
Pope John Paul II, St. Thomas More Church, Coventry
Eighth Army, Dunkirk, Normandy Veterans in St. Peter’s Church, Derby
Mayflower Pilgrims, Henlow, Hertfordshire
J.B. Priestley in Hubberholme, North Yorkshire
Foundation stone for West Yorkshire Playhouse
Bishop Kenneth Skelton in Lichfield Cathedral
Memorial to the Emergency Services, Commonwealth Games, Royal Maundy and Regimental Memorials in Manchester Cathedral
Royal Arms for Manchester Law Courts
Mary Potter Tomb in Nottingham Cathedral
War memorials for St Wilfrid’s Church, Preston
Preston Pals war memorial, Preston railway station
Plaque for the William Wordsworth Sesquicentenary, Rydal Mount, Cumbria
Burma Star memorial, Salisbury Cathedral
War Memorial, St Helen's Church, Saxby, Lincolnshire
Plaque for Lord Byron, Burgage Manor, Southwell, Nottinghamshire
Memorial to Arthur Troop, Christ Church, Stamford, Lincolnshire
Memorial to Tom Beastall, Tickhill Parish Church, South Yorkshire
Memorial for the Dunkeswick Air Disaster, Weeton Parish Church, North Yorkshire

References

1952 births
Living people
People from West Lindsey District
Alumni of Camberwell College of Arts
Alumni of the University of Brighton
Alumni of Birmingham City University
English calligraphers
British sculptors
British male sculptors
Stone carvers
British letter cutters
Date of birth missing (living people)
Place of birth missing (living people)